Penelope Ligonier, née Penelope Pitt (1749–1827), was an English aristocrat and socialite, and first wife of Edward Ligonier, Earl Ligonier of Clonmell.

She was the eldest daughter of Penelope Atkins and George Pitt, 1st Baron Rivers. Both her parents were 'noted for their extraordinary physical beauty', but their family life was unhappy due to her parents' turbulent marriage. Horace Walpole, an admirer of Penelope Atkins, alleged that George Pitt 'had heaped on her every possible cruelty and provoking outrage', and alleged that after their separation he prevented her from seeing their four children.

During the 1760s, while George Pitt was serving as envoy-extraordinary and minister plenipotentiary to Turin, Penelope was enrolled in a convent school in Lyon, where she met Edward Ligonier. They were married at the British Embassy in Paris on 16 December 1766.

When they relocated to Cobham Park after their marriage they continued to entertain an international circle of friends, one of whom was Count Vittorio Amadeo Alfieri, an Italian poet and dramatist, with whom she began an affair. The discovery of her infidelity by her husband in 1771 led to a duel Alfieri and Ligonier in Hyde Park, followed by a criminal conversation trial which made public the salacious testimony of servants, and extracts from the couple's passionate love letters. A fictionalised version of the relationship appeared titled Lord Lelius and the Fair Emelia, or, The Generous Husband, and Alfieri would later include a sensational account of his liaison with Lady Ligonier in his memoirs. Ligonier would eventually divorce her via the expensive and protracted process of a private parliamentary bill of divorce. However, due to rumours of previous relationships between Penelope and members of her household staff, Count Alfieri refused to marry her and salvage her reputation.

After the 1771 trial she took a 12-week trip to Italy to escape from the scandal, accompanied by Alfieri, her mother, and her sister-in-law Frances Balfour. On her return to England she returned to live in a cottage on the outskirts of her father's estate at her father's request. She joined a circle of contemporary aristocratic women who could still participate in polite London society, but as a result of scandalous personal lives were generally considered courtesans by wider society as a result of their personal choices. She was a prominent member of the New Female Coterie, a social club founded for such women, alongside such personal friends and fellow 'demi-reps' as Lady Grosvenor and Seymour Dorothy Fleming. Her reputation for licentiousness was so strong that she was featured in a satirical 1777 cartoon of licentious aristocratic women called 'The Diabo-Lady' in The London Magazine.

At Northampton on May 4, 1784 she married Captain Smith, a trooper in the Royal Horse Guard Blues.

In April 1791 she wrote to Alfieri that their affair had liberated her from the constraints 'of a world in which I was never formed to exist', and her contentment and health in her life after leaving her first marriage.

References 

English courtesans
English socialites
1749 births
1827 deaths